Brévands is a former commune in the Manche department in Normandy in northwestern France. On 1 January 2017, it was merged into the commune Carentan-les-Marais.

Population

See also
Communes of the Manche department

References

Former communes of Manche